The Stewart Mountain Dam is a concrete thin arch dam located 41 miles northeast of Phoenix, Arizona. The dam includes a 13,000 kilowatt (kW) hydroelectric generating unit that is operated by SRP (Salt River Project), an Arizona public utility. It is primarily operated during the summer months. The dam forms Saguaro Lake as it slows the passage of the Salt River in Maricopa County, Arizona. It was named after a ranch that used to be located nearby known as the Old Stewart Ranch.

A camp was built just below the dam in 1927 to house the construction workers; after the damn's completion it was turned into the Saguaro Lake Guest Ranch.

The dam was listed on the National Register of Historic Places in 2017.

Gallery

References

External links
 

Dams in Arizona
Hydroelectric power plants in Arizona
Arch dams
Buildings and structures in Maricopa County, Arizona
United States Bureau of Reclamation dams
Dams completed in 1930
Dams on the Salt River (Arizona)
Historic American Engineering Record in Arizona
National Register of Historic Places in Maricopa County, Arizona
Dams on the National Register of Historic Places in Arizona